Mullet Key is a historic island near Crystal River, Florida. It is located 3 miles south of the main mouth of the Crystal River, and was inhabited by Native Americans in pre-Columbian times. The island was occupied from roughly 500 to 1500 and was inhabited by the Deptford and Safety Harbor cultures. Oyster shell middens have been found at the site. On July 3, 1986, it was added to the U.S. National Register of Historic Places.

In popular culture
Mullet Key is referenced in the movie The Punisher.

References

External links

 Citrus County listings at National Register of Historic Places

Archaeological sites in Florida
Islands of Citrus County, Florida
Islands of Florida
Archaeological sites on the National Register of Historic Places in Florida
Shell middens in Florida
National Register of Historic Places in Citrus County, Florida